Joseph Hall may refer to:

Sports
 Joe Hall (American football) (born 1979), American football player
 Joe Hall (baseball) (born 1966), American baseball player
 Joe Hall (ice hockey) (1881–1919), Canadian ice hockey player
 Joe B. Hall (1928–2022), American college basketball coach

Others
 Joseph Hall (bishop) (1574–1656), English bishop, satirist and moralist
 Joseph Hall (metallurgist) (1789–1862)
 Joseph Hall (Maine politician) (1793–1859), US Representative from Maine
 Joseph Hall (mayor) (1800s–1857), mayor of Adelaide, 1854–1855
 Joe Hall (musician) (1947–2019), Canadian singer-songwriter
 Joe Hall (trade unionist) (1887–1964), British trade unionist
 Joseph M. Hall, Jr., historian, writer and professor
 Joseph N. Hall (born 1966), American author

See also
 Murder of Jeff Hall, by his 10-year-old son Joseph Hall